This is a list of third-party performances in United States presidential elections. In the United States it is rare for third party and independent candidates, other than those of the six parties which have succeeded as major parties (Federalist Party, Democratic-Republican Party, National Republican Party, Democratic Party, Whig Party, Republican Party), to take large shares of the vote in elections, unless in a realigning election.

Occasionally, a third party becomes one of the two major parties through a presidential election (the last time it happened was in 1856, when the Republicans supplanted the Whigs, who had withered and endorsed the ticket of the American Party): such an election is called a realigning election, as it causes a realignment in the party system; according to scholars, there have been six party systems so far. Only once one of the two major parties came third in an election, but that did not cause a realignment (in 1912 the Progressive Party surpassed the Republicans, but the party quickly disappeared and the Republicans re-gained their major party status).

In the 59 presidential elections since 1788, third party or independent candidates have won at least 5.0% of the vote or garnered electoral votes 12 times (21%); this does not count George Washington, who was elected as an independent in 1788–1780 and 1792, but who largely supported Federalist policies and was supported by Federalists. The last third-party candidate to win a state was George Wallace of the American Independent Party in 1968, while the last third-party candidate to win more than 5.0% of the vote was Ross Perot, who ran as an independent and as the standard-bearer of the Reform Party in 1992 and 1996, respectively; the closest since was Gary Johnson in 2016, who gained 3.3% of the vote running as the Libertarian nominee. The most recent third-party candidates to receive an electoral vote were Libertarian Ron Paul and Sioux Nation independent Faith Spotted Eagle who received a vote each from faithless electors in 2016.

Major third party performances (1788–present)

The list includes the third-party candidates that captured at least one state and/or more than 5% of the popular vote.

Other third party candidates (1788–present) 

The list includes the third-party candidates that captured less than 5% but more than 1% of the popular vote and no electoral votes.

Notable third-party presidential performances by state (1832–present)
The list includes the statewide performance of third-party candidates who accrued 5% or more of a States' popular vote.

Many third-party candidates also have run under different affiliations in different States. They do this for many reasons, including laws restricting ballot access, cross endorsements by other established parties, etc. In the list below, the party column shows which affiliation(s) appeared on the ballot in which corresponding States.

Notable third party cross-endorsement presidential performances by state (1896–present)
The list includes the Statewide performance of major party candidates on party ballot lines other than their own, either through electoral fusion or having to run in opposition to their state party. This does not include those cases, such as found in present-day Connecticut or California, where a third party shares the same ballot line as the main party. The vote totals and percentages listed are those they received under that particular party label.

Once widespread, fusion as conventionally practiced remains legal in only eight states, and is most recognized by its use in New York.

Selected third party performances

1856 presidential election

In 1856 the two-party system of Democrats and Whigs collapsed. The Whigs, who had been one-half of the two-party system since 1832 and had won the presidency in 1840 and 1848, disintegrated. Southern Whigs and a minority of northern Whigs coalesced around the anti-immigrant and anti-Catholic American Party, better known as the "Know Nothing" movement. Their candidate was former President Millard Fillmore, who won 22% but carried only one state, Maryland, thus winning 8 electoral votes.  Many Northern Whigs, such as Abraham Lincoln, joined the newly formed Republican Party.  The Republicans ran John C. Frémont, who finished second with 33.1% and 114 electoral votes.  Democrat James Buchanan won the election.

1860 presidential election

John C. Breckinridge, the third-party candidate of southern Democrats, got 18.2% of the popular vote and won 72 electoral votes from several south states. John Bell of the Constitutional Union Party finished with 12.6% of the popular vote, but only won 39 electoral votes from three states.  Though both Bell and Breckinridge were unable to capture as many popular votes as the two main presidential candidates (Republican Abraham Lincoln and Democrat Stephen A. Douglas), this election would mark the first time any third party received more electoral votes than one of the major candidates in a US presidential election.  Douglas finished with 29.5% of the popular vote, but only won 12 electoral votes from two states.

In 1864 Abraham Lincoln ran his re-election campaign as a third party, known as National Union party, consisting of both Democrats and Republicans.

1872 presidential election

In the 1872 election, newspaper publisher and former Congressman Horace Greeley was nominated by the Liberal Republicans to oppose incumbent Republican President Ulysses S. Grant. The Liberal Republicans were a breakaway faction of the Republican Party that was dissatisfied with Grant's presidency. Determined to defeat Grant, the Democratic Party also nominated Greeley, making Greeley both a third party nominee and a major party nominee. Greeley won six states and 43.8% of the popular vote, but died shortly after election day, so most of the electoral votes that were pledged to Greeley instead went to Democrat Thomas Hendricks or Greeley's running mate, Liberal Republican Benjamin Gratz Brown.

1892 presidential election

James B. Weaver, the Greenback Labor nominee in 1880, ran as presidential candidate for the Populist Party. The Populist Party won 22 electoral votes and 8.51 percent of the popular vote . The Democratic Party eventually adopted many Populist Party positions after this election, notably the Populist call for the free coinage of silver, making this contest a prominent example of a delayed vote for change.

1912 presidential election

Republican Theodore Roosevelt ran as the "Bull Moose Party" (Progressive Party) nominee in the 1912 election.  Roosevelt won 27.4% of the popular vote and carried six states totaling 88 electoral votes.  Overall, Roosevelt's effort was the most successful third party candidacy in American history. It was also the only third party effort to finish higher than third in the popular votes and only the second to do so in electoral votes. Instead incumbent Republican President William Howard Taft finished third, taking only 23% of the popular vote and 8 electoral votes.  The split in the Republican vote gave Democrat Woodrow Wilson victory with 42% of the popular vote, but 435 electoral votes.

Eugene V. Debs, running in his fourth consecutive Presidential election as the Socialist Party candidate, won 6% of the vote, an all-time high for the Socialists. The elections of 1824, 1860 and 1912 are the only three times that four candidates each cleared 5% of the popular vote in a Presidential election.

1924 presidential election

Erstwhile Republican Robert M. La Follette ran as a Progressive. After the Democrats nominated conservative John W. Davis, many liberal Democrats turned to La Follette. He received 4,831,706 votes for 16.6% of the popular vote and won his home state of Wisconsin receiving 13 electoral votes.  With the Democrats split, incumbent President Calvin Coolidge won election by a wide margin.

1948 presidential election

Democrat Strom Thurmond ran on the segregationist States' Rights ("Dixiecrat") ticket. Former Vice President Henry A. Wallace ran on the liberal left as the candidate of a new Progressive Party.  Thus the Democratic vote was split three ways, between Thurmond on the right, Wallace on the left, and incumbent President Harry S. Truman in the center. Thurmond received 1,175,930 votes (2.4%) and 39 votes in the electoral college from Southern states. Wallace earned 1,157,328 votes for an identical 2.4% of the popular vote, but no votes in the Electoral College due to his support being mostly concentrated in the more populous states of New York and California.

The Unpledged Electors Movement 1944–1964

With the Democratic party becoming more amenable to the Civil Rights Movement, the numerous southern Democrats split from the party and started putting up slates of unpledged electors to compete with the national Democratic ticket. During the 1952, 1956, and 1960 elections these received a substantial percentage of votes, most notably coming in second in South Carolina in 1956 ahead of President Eisenhower, and actually winning Mississippi and splitting the electoral vote in Alabama in 1960, giving segregationist Senator Harry F. Byrd of Virginia 14 electoral votes. In 1964 Alabama members of the movement refused to put President Johnson on the ballot, leaving the electors unpledged.

1968 presidential election

Former Democratic Governor of Alabama George Wallace ran on the American Independent Party line. Wallace received 9,901,118 votes for 13.5% of the popular vote, receiving 45 electoral votes in the South and many votes in the North. Wallace remains the only third-party candidate since 1948 to win a state.

1972 presidential election

Despite only garnering 3,674 votes (roughly 0.005% of the actual electorate), John G. Hospers of the Libertarian Party secured one electoral vote in this election due to Virginia faithless elector, Roger MacBride. In addition, the results of the faithless elector made the Libertarian vice-presidential nominee Theodora "Tonie" Nathan the first woman in U.S. history to receive an electoral vote.

1980 presidential election

Congressman John B. Anderson received 5,719,850 votes, for 6.6% of the vote, as an independent candidate for president. Libertarian Party candidate Ed Clark won 921,128 votes, or 1.1% of the total. No other Libertarian candidate has ever gotten more than 0.5% in a presidential election until Gary Johnson won 1% in 2012.

1992 presidential election

Ross Perot, an independent, won 18.9% of the popular vote (but no electoral votes). His was the best popular vote showing ever for an independent candidate who stood alone on no third party ticket. Not until four years later would Perot seek to run for the first time on a third party ticket. As an independent, however, Perot finished second in two states: in Utah ahead of election winner Bill Clinton, and in Maine ahead of incumbent President George H. W. Bush.

1996 presidential election

Ross Perot ran for president again, this time as the candidate of the newly founded Reform Party. He won 8% of the popular vote.

2000 presidential election

Green Party candidate Ralph Nader received almost 3% of the vote nationwide, and his individual state totals were in some cases much higher, exceeding the margin between the two main candidates, including New Hampshire and Florida, the latter of which some could argue flipped the election from Gore to Bush.

2016 presidential election

The national total for third-party candidates and write-ins was well over 5%. In Utah, Evan McMullin received over 20% of the vote, while in Vermont, Senator Bernie Sanders received over 5% of the vote despite not appearing on the ballot. Libertarian candidate Gary Johnson received over four million votes nationwide, while Green candidate Jill Stein received over one million.

A record number of ten electors cast their votes for other candidates, three of which were disallowed. Most of these went to other Republicans and Democrats, but one vote went to Libertarian Ron Paul and Yankton Sioux Nation independent Faith Spotted Eagle.

References

Lists of elections in the United States
Presidential elections in the United States